Mislav Sever (born 15 December 1994) is a Croatian swimmer. He competed in the men's 100 metre freestyle event at the 2017 World Aquatics Championships.

References

1994 births
Living people
Croatian male swimmers
Place of birth missing (living people)
Croatian male freestyle swimmers
21st-century Croatian people